"Show Me Love" is a 1994 song by the Swedish duo Yaki-Da, released as the first single from their first album, Pride (1995). It was written by Jonas Berggren from Ace of Base, who also produced it, and was a top 20 hit in both Denmark and Norway, peaking at number 15 and 16. An accompanying music video was also filmed to promote the single, with Yaki-Da performing in an old mansion. The song was later re-recorded by Berggren's own band, Ace of Base, for its 2002 album Da Capo.

Track listing
 CD single, Europe (1994)
"Show Me Love" (Radio Edit) – 3:28
"Show Me Love" (Acoustic Version) – 3:27

Credits
Written by Jonas "Joker" Berggren
Vocals: Linda Schonberg and Marie Knutsen 
Produced by Joker
Recorded and mixed by John Ballard & Joker

Charts

References

1994 debut singles
1994 songs
Yaki-Da songs
1990s ballads
Pop ballads
Songs written by Jonas Berggren
Mega Records singles
English-language Swedish songs